Sergio Marcelo Vázquez Robledo (born October 14, 1972 in Trinidad, Uruguay) is a Uruguayan former football player. He played for clubs in Uruguay, Chile and México. He was part of Necaxa's squad that finished third in the 2000 FIFA Club World Championship.

Teams
  Montevideo Wanderers 1989–1994
  Deportes Temuco 1994–1995
  Rangers 1995–1996
  Deportes Antofagasta 1996–1997
  Necaxa 1997–2000
  Tigres UANL 2000–2001
  Puebla 2001–2003
  Nacional 2003
  Rangers 2004–2005

References

 Profile at BDFA 
 
 Profile at Tenfield Digital 

1972 births
Living people
Uruguayan footballers
People from Flores Department
Uruguay under-20 international footballers
Uruguayan expatriate footballers
Club Nacional de Football players
Montevideo Wanderers F.C. players
Club Puebla players
Club Necaxa footballers
Tigres UANL footballers
Rangers de Talca footballers
C.D. Antofagasta footballers
Deportes Temuco footballers
Chilean Primera División players
Primera B de Chile players
Liga MX players
Expatriate footballers in Chile
Expatriate footballers in Mexico

Association football midfielders